Richard George "Rich" Schutz (born December 21, 1965) is a former Olympic weightlifter for the United States. He was born in Chicago, Illinois.

Weightlifting achievements
 Olympic team member (1988 and 1992)
 Senior National Champion (1986–1994)

References

External links
 Rich Schutz – Hall of Fame at Weightlifting Exchange

American male weightlifters
Olympic weightlifters of the United States
Weightlifters at the 1988 Summer Olympics
Weightlifters at the 1992 Summer Olympics
Living people
1945 births
Sportspeople from Chicago
Pan American Games medalists in weightlifting
Pan American Games silver medalists for the United States
Weightlifters at the 1987 Pan American Games
Weightlifters at the 1991 Pan American Games
20th-century American people
21st-century American people